Underwood Park was a football ground in Paisley, Scotland. It was the home ground of Abercorn during their first decade in the Scottish Football League.

History
Abercorn moved to the ground in 1889 from Blackstoun Park. The new ground had a 750-capacity wooden stand along the western side of the pitch, with a pavilion brought from Blackstoun Park re-erected in the north-west corner of the ground. In 1890 the wooden stand had a roof added to it, with a cycling and running track later added around the pitch.

Abercorn were founder members of the Scottish Football League, and the first league game was played at Underwood Park on 13 September 1890 against Renton. However, when Renton were later expelled from the league, the result was expunged. On 22 March 1890 the ground was used for a British Home Championship game between Scotland and Wales, with Scotland winning 5–0. in front of a crowd of 7,500. Abercorn's highest league attendance at Underwood Park was set early the following season when 6,000 saw a 5–2 defeat to Celtic on 12 September 1891.

In 1899 Abercorn moved to Old Ralston Park, with the council buying the site to use for stables and waste destruction. The final league match was played at Underwood Park on 8 April 1899, a 3–3 draw against Ayr.

References

Defunct football venues in Scotland
Abercorn F.C.
Scottish Football League venues
Scotland national football team venues
Sports venues in Paisley, Renfrewshire
Sports venues completed in 1889
1889 establishments in Scotland
Sports venues demolished in 1899
1899 disestablishments in Scotland